Peru was the host nation of the 2019 Pan American Games in Lima, from July 26 to August 11, 2019.

Lima, the capital city, is the venue of the Games. The Peruvian team consisted of 599 athletes (315 men and 284 women).

During the opening ceremony of the games, sailor Stefano Peschiera carried the flag of the country as part of the parade of nations.

Medalists

The following Peruvian competitors won medals at the games.

|  style="text-align:left; width:78%; vertical-align:top;"|

|  style="text-align:left; width:26%; vertical-align:top;"|

Competitors
The following is the list of number of competitors (per gender) participating at the games per sport/discipline.

Archery

Men

Women

Misto

Badminton

Singles

Doubles

Baseball

Peru qualified a men's team of 24 athletes automatically as host nation.

Group A

Basque pelota

Men

Women

Beach volleyball

Peru automatically qualified four beach volleyball athletes (two men and two women) as the host nation.

Men
1 Pair (2 athletes)

Women
1 Pair (2 athletes)

Bodybuilding

Peru as the host nation qualified a full team of two bodybuilders (one male and one female), automatically.

No results were provided for the prejudging round, with only the top six advancing.

Bowling

Boxing

Peru qualified 11 boxers (eight men and three women). Seven of these were awarded automatically as host quotas, the rest were earned at the qualification tournament.

Men

Women

Canoeing

Slalom
Peru qualified a total of four slalom athletes (two men and two women). Both kayak quotas were awarded automatically to Peru as host nation, while the canoe quotas were earned in qualification.

Sprint

Men

Women

Qualification legend: QF – Qualify to final; SF – Qualify to semifinal

Diving

Men

Women

Equestrian

Peru qualified a full team of 12 equestrians (four per discipline) as the host nation.

Dressage

Eventing

Jumping

Fencing

Peru, as the host nation, was allocated a full team of 18 fencers (nine men and nine women).

Men
Épée – 3 quotas 
Foil – 3 quotas 
Sabre – 3 quotas 

Women
Épée – 3 quotas 
Foil – 3 quotas 
Sabre – 3 quotas

Golf

Peru as host nation automatically qualified a full team of four golfers (two men and two women).

Gymnastics

Trampoline
Peru qualified a one male trampolinist.

Field hockey

Peru qualified a men's and women's team (of 16 athletes each, for a total of 32) by virtue of being the host nation.

Men's tournament

Preliminary round

Quarter-finals

Cross over

7th place match

Women's tournament

Preliminary round

Quarter-finals

Cross over

7th place match

Football

Peru automatically (as host nation) qualified a men's and women's team (of 18 athletes each, for a total of 36).

Men's tournament

Women's tournament

Modern pentathlon

Peru as host nation received four modern pentathlete quotas (two men and two women).

Men
2 quotas

Women
2 quotas

Racquetball

Peru qualified three male racquetball athletes.

Men
3 quotas

Rugby sevens

Women's tournament

Pool stage

5th-8th classification

Fifth place match

Sailing

Peru received automatic qualification of 11 boats for a total of 17 sailors.

Men

Women

Mixed

Open

Shooting

Men

Women

Mixed

Softball

Peru qualified a men's and women's team (of 15 athletes each) by virtue of being the host nation.

Men's tournament

Preliminary round

Women's tournament

Preliminary round

Squash

Men

Women

Mixed

Surfing

Peru as host nation received a quota allocation of ten surfers (five men and five women) in the sport's debut at the Pan American Games.

Of the 8 medal events (Four Men and four Women), Peru won 3 gold medals, 3 silver medals and 1 bronze. Lucca Mesinas (Open surf Men), "Piccolo" Benoit Clemente (Longboard) and Daniella Rosas (Open surg Women) made history for Peru winning three gold medals in a day. Also Tamil Martino (Stand up paddle Men), Vania Torres (Stand up paddle Women) and María Fernanda Reyes (Longboard Women) got 3 silver medals. Itzel Delgado won the first medal of this sport for Peru in Stand up paddle race. The Stand up paddle race Women was the only event where Peru got no winners at all.

Artistic

Race

Table tennis

Men

Women

Mixed

Taekwondo

Kyorugi (sparring)
Men

Women

Poomsae (forms)

Tennis

Men

Women

Mixed

Volleyball

Summary

Men's tournament 

Preliminary round

Seventh place match

Women's tournament 

Preliminary round

Fifth place match

Water skiing

Water skiing
Men

Women

Wakeboarding

Weightlifting

As host nation, Peru was permitted to enter a full team of 12 weightlifters (six men and six women).

Men

Women

Wrestling

Men

  Shalom Villegas, from Venezuela, lost the silver medal for a doping violation. 

Women

See also
Peru at the 2020 Summer Olympics

References

Nations at the 2019 Pan American Games
Pan American Games
2019